Arthur George Smith (November 29, 1906 — May 15, 1962) was a Canadian professional ice hockey player who played 137 games in the National Hockey League with the Toronto Maple Leafs and Ottawa Senators between 1927 and 1931. He was born in Toronto, Ontario.

Career statistics

Regular season and playoffs

External links 
 

1906 births
1962 deaths
Boston Cubs players
Canadian ice hockey defencemen
Chicago Shamrocks players
Ontario Hockey Association Senior A League (1890–1979) players
Ottawa Senators (1917) players
Ice hockey people from Toronto
Toronto Falcons (CPHL) players
Toronto Maple Leafs players